The Alliance Review is a community-based newspaper in Alliance, Ohio, and nearby areas of Northeast Ohio. The paper publishes six days a week and has a circulation size of close to 14,000. The Review was founded in 1888, and is currently owned by Gannett (formerly GateHouse Media), who acquired the newspaper in February 2017 from Dix Communications.

Sources

External links
 

Gannett publications
Newspapers published in Ohio
Publications established in 1888
Alliance, Ohio
1888 establishments in Ohio